South Kvarken is the narrowest stretch of sea between Finnish Åland and Sweden, forming a strait connecting the Sea of Åland and the Bothnian Sea of approximately 30 km (18.5 mi) across.

Straits of Finland
Straits of Sweden
Finland–Sweden border
International straits
Landforms of Västerbotten County
Gulf of Bothnia